Østerport station is a metro, S-train and main line railway station in Copenhagen, Denmark. It is located between the districts of Indre By and Østerbro, and is named for the historic Østerport city gate, near the original location of which it is located.

The station is served by some InterCity services across Denmark, regular and frequent regional train services to and from Zealand and southern Sweden, as well as commuter rail services on the S-train network. As of 29 September 2019, Østerport is also served by the Copenhagen Metro City Circle Line and M4.

The station is used by approximately 30,000 passengers each day.

History

The station opened in 1897 as the southern terminus of the Coast Line from Copenhagen to Helsingør. It was originally named the East Station.

It was originally the terminus for the Coast Line, but when the station was connected with Nørreport Station and Copenhagen Central Station via the Boulevard Line in 1917, the terminus moved to the Central Station. In 1934, the station started serving S-trains.

Architecture 

The station was designed by Danish architect Heinrich Wenck, who was head architect of the Danish State Railways from 1894 to 1921. The station is designed in National Romantic style, a Nordic architectural style that was part of the National Romantic movement during the late 19th and early 20th centuries, and which is often considered to be a form of Art Nouveau.

Although intended to be a temporary solution, the original station building has survived to the present date. It was restored in the 1980s, and again in the 2010s.

Services 

The station is served by some InterCity services across Denmark, regular and frequent regional train services to and from Zealand and southern Sweden, as well as commuter rail services on the S-train network. By 2019, the service was included the Copenhagen Metro as well (future line M4).

The metro station 

The Copenhagen Metro line M3 (opened 2019) on the City Circle Line serves another station called Østerport. The metro station is located under the street Østbanegade with the staircase towards Østerport station. Another line M4 later supplement line M3, going to Nordhavn and Ny Ellebjerg. A subway between the metro platforms to Østerport station is in operating.

Service

Cultural references
Østerport station is seen at 1:24:15 (track 13) and again at 1:24:48 /track 5/) in the 1975 Olsen-banden film The Olsen Gang on the Track.

References

External links

 Description on DSB site

Coast Line (Denmark)
City Circle Line (Copenhagen Metro) stations
M4 (Copenhagen Metro) stations
Railway stations in Copenhagen
Listed railway stations in Copenhagen
S-train (Copenhagen) stations
Railway stations opened in 1897
Heinrich Wenck railway stations
Art Nouveau architecture in Copenhagen
Art Nouveau railway stations
National Romantic architecture in Copenhagen
Timber framed buildings in Copenhagen
Listed buildings and structures in Østerbro
Railway stations in Denmark opened in the 19th century